The Triple J Hottest 100 of the Past 20 Years was a poll conducted by Triple J to celebrate the 20th anniversary of the Hottest 100's current format. Voters were allowed to vote for 20 songs that were released from 1 January 1993 until 31 December 2012. Voting was open for 20 days from 14 May to 2 June. #100–51 was broadcast on 8 June and #50–1 was broadcast the following day.

Full list
Bold: Previous winner of an annual Hottest 100
Green background: Australian artists

Artists with multiple entries

Three tracks
 The Killers (7, 75, 86)
 Silverchair (17, 78, 90)
 Daft Punk (44, 59, 65)

Two tracks
 Jeff Buckley (3, 36)
 Powderfinger (8, 10)
 Gotye (9, 12)
 Radiohead (13, 35)
 The Smashing Pumpkins (21, 25)
 Red Hot Chili Peppers (28, 30)
 Beastie Boys (37, 100)
 Gorillaz (52, 71)
 MGMT (64, 76)
 Jebediah (91, 98)

Nations represented
United States - 42
Australia - 29
United Kingdom - 25
France - 3
Iceland - 1
Ireland - 1
New Zealand - 1

Songs by decade
1990s - 44
2000s - 48
2010s - 8

References

External links
 Triple J Hottest 100 of the Past 20 Years

2013 in Australian music
Australia Triple J Hottest 100 Albums
2013